Manilkara subsericea is a species of plant in the family Sapotaceae. It is endemic to Brazil, and threatened by habitat loss.

References

subsericea
Plants described in 1839
Conservation dependent plants
Flora of Brazil
Taxonomy articles created by Polbot